The Jonesville Academy is a historic school building at Cochran and Duxbury Roads in Richmond, Vermont.  Built about 1868, it is a prominent local example of Italianate school architecture, and was used as a school until 1955.  It is now in private ownership as a residence.  It was listed on the National Register of Historic Places in 1982.

Description and history
The former Jonesville Academy building stands south of the now-rural village of Jonesville, on the south side of the Winooski River at the junction of Cochran and Duxbury Roads.  Oriented facing west to Cochran Road, it is a two-story wood frame structure, with a gabled roof and clapboarded exterior.  A square tower projects slightly from the front facade, rising to a pyramidal roof with a broad eave.  The main entrance is at the base of the tower, sheltered by a heavy Italianate hood.  Above the entrance is a double sash window, above which a smaller but similarly featured hood projects.  The main roof gable and eaves are decorated with paired Italianate brackets.

The school was built about 1868, and is a fine example of an Italianate schoolhouse in rural Vermont.  It originally served as Richmond's high school, located in what was at the time a busy mill village.  It was later converted into a grade school, and was finally closed in 1955.  It served for a time as a hall for the local Grange chapter, and eventually reverted to private ownership.  Part of the building has been converted into residential use, carefully preserving many of its original interior features.

See also
National Register of Historic Places listings in Chittenden County, Vermont

References

School buildings on the National Register of Historic Places in Vermont
National Register of Historic Places in Chittenden County, Vermont
Italianate architecture in Vermont
School buildings completed in 1868
Buildings and structures in Richmond, Vermont
1868 establishments in Vermont